Kolomna is a historical city in Moscow Oblast, Russia, situated at the confluence of the Moskva and Oka Rivers,  (by rail) southeast of Moscow. Population:

History
Mentioned for the first time in 1177, Kolomna was founded in 1140–1160 according to the latest archaeological surveys. Kolomna's name may originate from the Old Russian term for "on the bend (in the river)", especially as the old city is located on a sharp bend in the Moscow River. In 1301, Kolomna became the first town to be incorporated into the Moscow Principality.

Like some other ancient Russian cities, it has a kremlin, which is a citadel similar to the more famous one in Moscow and also built of red brick. The stone Kolomna Kremlin was built from 1525–1531 under the Russian Tsar Vasily III. The Kolomna citadel was a part of the Great Abatis Border and, although much of the surrounding wall was removed in the eighteenth century and materials used to construct other public buildings, the remaining stretch of wall,  several towers, and some interior buildings have been preserved and held in good shape with a museum located inside. In front of the façade stands a statue of Dmitry Donskoy, celebrating the gathering of his troops in Kolomna prior to the Battle of Kulikovo in 1380.

The civic arms of Kolomna were granted by Empress Catherine II, who was influenced by the similar-sounding name of the famous Colonna family of Rome. Hence, the similar appearance of the arms, despite there being no connection between the Roman family and the city of Kolomna.

Due to sensitive military production of missile components, Kolomna was a closed city until 1994. It is not listed as a city of the Golden Ring, despite its kremlin and the large number of well-preserved churches and monasteries.

Administrative and municipal status
Within the framework of administrative divisions, Kolomna serves as the administrative center of Kolomensky District, even though it is not a part of it. As an administrative division, it is incorporated separately as Kolomna City Under Oblast Jurisdiction—an administrative unit with the status equal to that of the districts. As a municipal division, Kolomna City Under Oblast Jurisdiction is incorporated as Kolomna Urban Okrug.

Climate

Transportation

Kolomna is located on the Ryazan line of the Moscow railroad,  from Moscow. In Kolomna, there are five railway stations (Kolomna, Shchurovo, Bochmanovo, 6 km, and Sychevo) and one terminal (Golutvin).

Two bus terminals are located in the city. Public transport in the city is represented by tram and city bus lines.

Kolomna is situated on three rivers, and has passenger and transport berths, with the most well-known being Bochmanovo berth.

Sports

The Kolomna Speed Skating Center is an indoor ice speed skating oval used for Russian and international championships. It hosted the 2008 European Speed Skating Championships and the 2016 World Single Distance Speed Skating Championships. The Kolomna Speed Skating Center is considered one of the most modern ice speed skating ovals in the world.

Demographics

Notable people

 Vitalik Buterin, Russian-Canadian programmer, writer, and creator of Ethereum
 Dmitry Dorofeyev, speed skater
 Philaret Drozdov, Metropolitan of Moscow
 Nikolay Epshtein, Soviet ice hockey coach
 Edward Frenkel, Russian-American mathematician
 Ivan Lazhechnikov, writer
 Eduard Malofeyev, football player and manager
 Mikhail Katukov, commander of armored troops in the Red Army
 Mikhail Tyurin, cosmonaut
 Olga Graf, speed skater
 Sergey Gorshkov, Soviet admiral
 Sergey Malitsky, fantasy fiction writer
 Yekaterina Lobysheva, speed skater

Attractions
  
Kolomna Kremlin including:
 Kolomna Cathedral
 New Golutvin Monastery
 Bobrenev Monastery
Old Golutvin Monastery near the city, at the confluence of the Moskva and Oka rivers
 Posad, with several parish churches
 Church of John the Baptist, one of the oldest surviving buildings in the Moscow region (datable to the 14th century)
 Museum of pastila, a locally produced fruit candy
 Kolomna Speed Skating Center
 Museum of Organic Culture

International relations

Twin towns and sister cities
Kolomna is twinned with:
 Maladzyechna, Belarus
 Bauska, Latvia
 Moscow, Russia

References

Notes

Sources

 
Cities and towns in Moscow Oblast
Kolomensky Uyezd
Populated places established in the 12th century
1177 establishments in Europe
12th-century establishments in Russia